The Mount Gargues pipistrelle (Pipistrellus aero) is a species of vesper bat found in Kenya and believed to be widely distributed across highlands in Ethiopia. It typically lives in subtropical or tropical forests.

References

Pipistrellus
Mammals described in 1912
Bats of Africa
Endemic fauna of Kenya
Mammals of Kenya
Taxonomy articles created by Polbot
Taxa named by Edmund Heller